Transmutation Live is a live album by experimental rock band Praxis, recorded during a performance in Zurich, Switzerland, in the summer of 1996.

The album features the lineup of bassist Bill Laswell, guitarist Buckethead, drummer Brain and Invisibl Skratch Piklz, the Bay-Area collective of turntablists DXT, Q-Bert, Mix Master Mike, Shortkut, and DJ Disk.

The album's four tracks are labeled simply as Movements 1 to 4 and are predominantly ambient soundscapes that frequently give way to heavy metal grooves.

Track listing

Personnel
Bill Laswell – bass guitar
Buckethead – electric guitar
Brain – drums, percussion
Invisible Scratch Pickles – turntables, samples

Production staff
 Bacon – design
 Cimarron – design
 O'Brien – design
 Oz Fritz – engineer
 James Koehnline – cover art
 Bill Murphy – liner notes
 Robert Musso – production, mastering

References

Praxis (band) albums
1997 live albums